In fluid dynamics and turbulence theory, Reynolds decomposition is a mathematical technique used to separate the expectation value of a quantity from its fluctuations.

Decomposition
For example, for a quantity  the decomposition would be

The fluctuations are defined as the expectation value subtracted from quantity  such that their time average equals zero. 

The expected value, is often found from an ensemble average which is an average taken over multiple experiments under identical conditions. The expected value is also sometime denoted , but it is also seen often with the over-bar notation.

Due to computational constraints, simplifications of the Navier-Stokes equations are useful to parameterize turbulence that are smaller than the computational grid, allowing larger computational domains.

Reynolds decomposition allows the simplification of the Navier–Stokes equations by substituting in the sum of the steady component and perturbations to the velocity profile and taking the mean value. The resulting equation contains a nonlinear term known as the Reynolds stresses which gives rise to turbulence.

See also
Reynolds-averaged Navier–Stokes equations

References

Turbulence